The Sony Cyber-shot DSC-TX5 is a digital still camera announced by Sony on February 18, 2010. It boasts advanced features like Backlight Correction HDR, Hand-Held Twilight aided by the Exmor R CMOS sensor, and the intelligent panorama stitching mode, called the iSweep. The camera also has a waterproof body (up to 10 feet), which also makes it dust-proof. It is also freeze-proof for up to -10° Celsius and shock-proof, when dropped from a height of about 1.5 meters. Sony describes it as a rugged camera.

Specifications

Technical specifications

Lens
The camera has a Carl Zeiss lens, with 4x zoom capability, though the digital zoom can go up to 8x. The focal length of the lens is 4.43 - 17.7 mm.

LCD screen
The camera does not have a viewfinder. It is equipped with 3 inch touchscreen TFT display, which covers the entire back side of the device. It has about 230,400 usable pixels on the screen.

Special Features

iSweep Panorama
The DSC-TX5 can capture large panorama shots. Up to a hundred  shots are taken by sweeping the camera from one side to the other. The camera can be swept from left-to-right, right-to-left and even up-to-down and down-to-up for vertical panoramas. It intelligently stitches the photos together and reduces the blur from moving subjects. It has support for up to 258° panoramic shots, which gives a 7,152 x 1,080 dimension image.

Face Detection
The DSC-TX5 is also equipped with face detection technology, which recognizes up to 8 faces on the screen. It can also focus specifically on adult or child faces and also has an optional Smile Shutter, which detects a smile and automatically shoots an image.

Recording mode
The Cyber-shot DSC-TX5 is compatible with Memory Stick Duo, Memory Stick PRO Duo, Memory Stick PRO-HG Duo, media and SD/SDHC/SDXC media. It cannot shoot video onto a Memory Stick Duo. It also has built-in 45 MB internal memory for emergency use.

References

TX5
Cameras introduced in 2010